Thomas Lichfield (died 1586) was an English politician.

He was a Member (MP) of the Parliament of England for Aylesbury in 1571 and 1572.

In 1573, he married Margaret, the daughter of Thomas Pakington, Sheriff of Worcester.

References

Year of birth missing
1586 deaths
English MPs 1571
English MPs 1572–1583